The 2015–16 Armenian Premier League season is the 24th since its establishment. The season began on 1 August 2015 and ended up on 22 May 2016. FC Pyunik are the defending champions.

Teams
The eight teams from the 2014–15 Premier League will all compete in this year's competition.

Personnel and sponsorship

Managerial changes

League table

Results
The league was played in four stages. The teams played four times with each other, twice at home and twice away, for a total of 28 matches per team.

First half of season

Second half of season

Top goalscorers

See also
 2015–16 Armenian First League
 2015–16 Armenian Cup

References

External links
 ffa.am
 soccerway.com
 uefa.com
 rsssf.com

Armenian Premier League seasons
Arm
1